Pandurangadu is 2008 Telugu-language biographical film, based on the life of Pundarika, produced by K. Krishna Mohana Rao on R. K. Film Associates banner, directed by K. Raghavendra Rao. Starring Nandamuri Balakrishna and Sneha  while Tabu plays a supporting role and music composed by M. M. Keeravani. The film is remake of N. T. Rama Rao's old Telugu Movie Panduranga Mahatyam (1957). The film received positive reviews, but bombed at the box office.

Plot
Pundarika Ranganathudu is a follower of Lord Krishna but for the wrong reasons and does not listen to his father and his mother. He does all the mischievous things that Lord Krishna did in his reign. Once when his family members ask him to marry he leaves his village and runs away. After his family members perform a yagnam he comes back to his village. In the neighboring village, Lakshmi is a big devotee of Lord Krishna. One night Lord Krishna appears in her dreams and asks her to marry Pundarika. So Lakshmi's father approaches Pundarika but he refuses. Later, after some persuasion from Lakshmi, Pundarika accepts the marriage. Meanwhile, a dancer Amrutha comes to their village. Pundarika is mesmerized by her beauty and gets into a relationship with her. He offers all the gold in his house to her. But, after the marriage, he stops visiting Amrutha. Knowing this Amrutha's mother calls Pundarika for a meal and serves Kala Kuta Rasayana, which makes him violent at a small sound and grabs all his wealth. Then he lands in an unknown place where he kicks a saint and is cursed. The rest of the film is about how Pundarika returns to his family and becomes a devotee of Lord Krishna.

Cast

Soundtrack

Music composed by M. M. Keeravani.

References

External links
 

2000s Telugu-language films
2008 films
Films directed by K. Raghavendra Rao
Films scored by M. M. Keeravani
Remakes of Indian films